The 2019 NXT TakeOver: Toronto was the 26th NXT TakeOver and the second and final TakeOver: Toronto professional wrestling livestreaming event produced by WWE. It was held exclusively for wrestlers from the promotion's NXT brand division. The event aired exclusively on the WWE Network and took place on August 10, 2019, at the Scotiabank Arena in Toronto, Ontario, Canada as part of that year's SummerSlam weekend.

Seven matches were contested at the event, including two taped for the following week's episode of NXT. In the main event, Adam Cole defeated Johnny Gargano in a two-out-of-three falls match to retain the NXT Championship. The undercard saw NXT Women's Champion Shayna Baszler, NXT North American Champion Velveteen Dream, and NXT Tag Team Champions Street Profits (Angelo Dawkins and Montez Ford) retain their titles.

Production

Background
TakeOver was a series of professional wrestling shows that began in May 2014, as WWE's then-developmental league NXT held their second WWE Network-exclusive event, billed as TakeOver. In subsequent months, the "TakeOver" moniker became the brand used by WWE for all of their NXT live specials. In 2016, NXT held an event titled NXT TakeOver: Toronto, which took place in Toronto, Ontario, Canada at the Air Canada Centre. A second TakeOver: Toronto event was scheduled to be held on August 10, 2019, as the 26th NXT TakeOver event. It took place at the same venue, which had been renamed to Scotiabank Arena in 2018, and was a support show for that year's SummerSlam pay-per-view.

Storylines 

The card comprised five matches. The matches resulted from scripted storylines, where wrestlers portrayed heroes, villains, or less distinguishable characters that built tension and culminated in a wrestling match or series of matches. Results were predetermined by WWE's writers on the NXT brand, while storylines were produced on their weekly television program, NXT.

At TakeOver: XXV, Adam Cole defeated Johnny Gargano to win the NXT Championship. On the July 17 episode of NXT, Cole and Gargano confronted each other and a brawl ensued. NXT General Manager William Regal then scheduled the two in a two-out-of-three falls match for the title at TakeOver: Toronto with Cole and Gargano respectively choosing the stipulations for the first two falls; however, Regal would decide the final stipulation if a tie occurred. On the July 24 episode of NXT, Gargano and Cole chose their stipulations. Gargano chose a street fight, while Cole chose a singles match.

Event

Preliminary matches 
The event opened with The Street Profits (Angelo Dawkins and Montez Ford) defending the NXT Tag Team Championship against The Undisputed Era (Bobby Fish and Kyle O'Reilly). Ford performed a Frog Splash on O'Reilly to retain the title.

Next, Io Shirai faced Candice LeRae. Shirai forced LeRae to pass out to a Grounded Koji Clutch to win the match by submission.

After that, The Velveteen Dream defended the NXT North American Championship against Roderick Strong and Pete Dunne. Strong performed the End of Heartache on Dunne but Dream performed a Purple Rainmaker on Strong and Dunne. Dream pinned Dunne to retain the title.

In the penultimate bout, Shayna Baszler defended the NXT Women's Championship against Mia Yim. Baszler forced Yim to submit to a Figure Four Headscissors to retain the title.

Main event 
In the main event, Adam Cole defended the NXT Championship against Johnny Gargano in a 2 out of 3 Falls match. The first fall was a singles match. Gargano was disqualified for striking Cole with a chair, meaning Cole won the first fall. The second fall was a Street Fight. Gargano forced Cole to submit to the Garga-No-Escape to win the second fall. The third fall was a Barbed Wire Steel Cage match. Cole performed a Panama Sunrise on Gargano for a near-fall. Cole performed a Panama Sunrise off a ladder on Gargano for a near-fall. Gargano performed an Avalanche Front Flip Piledriver on Cole for a two count. Atop the cage, Cole and Gargano fell through a table. Cole pinned Gargano to retain the title 2-1.

Aftermath
The 2019 TakeOver: Toronto would be the last in the TakeOver: Toronto chronology, which was a subseries of TakeOvers that were held at the same venue in Toronto, Ontario, Canada. It was also the last NXT TakeOver held before the NXT brand became recognized as one of WWE's three main brands in September, although the brand reverted, in part, to its developmental roots in September 2021.

Results

References

External links
 

Toronto (2019)
2019 WWE Network events
Professional wrestling in Toronto
Events in Toronto
August 2019 events in Canada
2019 in Toronto
WWE in Canada